Strathbogie  may refer to:
 Strathbogie, Scotland, the former name of Huntly, Scotland, and the strath to the south of it
Strathbogie Castle, former name of Huntly Castle, the ancestral home of the chief of Clan Gordon, Earl of Huntly
 Strathbogie Park, the former name of Christie Park, Huntly, home ground of association football club Huntly F.C.
 Strathbogie, Victoria, Australia
 Shire of Strathbogie, Victoria, Australia
 Strathbogie Ranges, Victoria, Australia